Paul Wigley is professor of animal microbial ecosystems at the University of Bristol.

Selected publications

References

External links 

Living people
Veterinary scientists
Academics of the University of Bristol
Academics of the University of Liverpool
Year of birth missing (living people)